The United States Court of Appeals for the Eleventh Circuit (in case citations, 11th Cir.) is a federal court with appellate jurisdiction over the following U.S. district courts:

 Middle District of Alabama
 Northern District of Alabama
 Southern District of Alabama
 Middle District of Florida
 Northern District of Florida
 Southern District of Florida
 Middle District of Georgia
 Northern District of Georgia
 Southern District of Georgia

These districts were originally part of the Fifth Circuit, but were split off to form the Eleventh Circuit on October 1, 1981. For this reason, Fifth Circuit decisions from before this split are considered binding precedent in the Eleventh Circuit.

The court is based at the Elbert P. Tuttle U.S. Court of Appeals Building in Atlanta, Georgia. The building is named for Elbert Tuttle, who served as Chief Judge of the Fifth Circuit in the 1960s and was known for issuing decisions which advanced the civil rights of African-Americans.

The Eleventh Circuit is one of the thirteen United States courts of appeals.

Current composition of the court 
:

Vacancies and pending nominations

List of former judges

Chief judges

Succession of seats

See also 
 Courts of Georgia
 
 Garcia-Mir v. Meese
 List of current United States Circuit Judges
 List of United States federal courthouses in Alabama
 List of United States federal courthouses in Georgia
 List of United States federal courthouses in Florida

Notes

References 
 
 primary but incomplete source for the duty stations
 
 secondary source for the duty stations
 data is current to 2002
 
 source for the state, lifetime, term of active judgeship, term of chief judgeship, term of senior judgeship, appointer, termination reason, and seat information

External links 

 United States Court of Appeals for the Eleventh Circuit
 Recent opinions from FindLaw
 Courthouse map links: 

 
1981 establishments in the United States
Courts and tribunals established in 1981